The Wei River is a major river in west-central China's Gansu and Shaanxi provinces. It is the largest tributary of the Yellow River and very important in the early development of Chinese civilization.

However, due to the sharp turn north the Yellow River takes in Lanzhou, the Wei and the Yellow River do not meet for more than  further along the Yellow River's course.

The Wei River's tributaries include the Luo River, Jing River, Niutou River, Feng River and the Chishui River.

The Wei River valley has a continental climate, with hot summers and cool, dry winters. It sits between the arid steppes and deserts to the north and the forests of the Qingling mountains. Its natural vegetation would be a steppe-forest, but it has been transformed by human activity and is mostly agricultural.

History 

In Chinese mythology, the giant Kua Fu drained the Yellow River and the Wei River to quench his burning thirst as he pursued the Sun. The valley of the Wei was one of the early cradles of Chinese civilization, along which the capitals of the Zhou, Qin, Han, and Tang dynasties were situated. The area of Dingxi around its headwaters in Gansu has numerous Stone Age sites from various early cultures. The Wei Valley is likely the earliest center of Chinese civilization, and also the location of China's first major irrigation works. Some Chinese historians now believe the Wei is the ancient Jiang River that gave its name to the families of Shennong and the Yan emperor, two Chinese legendary heroes credited with the early development of agriculture there.

As "China's natural gateway" to the west, the headwaters of the Wei River are also notable in the development of the Northern Silk Road. The Chinese segment of the Northern Silk Road connected Chang'an (then the capital of China) to the west via Baoji, Tianshui at the Wei's headwaters, Lanzhou, Dunhuang, and the Wushao Ling Mountain, before looping north of the Taklamakan on its way to Kashgar and the routes into Parthia.

The Wei River Bridge (Weihe Qiao 渭河桥) featured in the design of the 5000-yuan note of the first series of the renminbi, dated 1953, and shows a train passing over the bridge.

Construction of the Sanmenxia Dam in 1960 caused extensive sedimentation problems in the lower reaches of the Wei river.

In September 2003 extensive rainfall led to flooding that caused over 30 fatalities, and temporarily displaced over 300,000 people. Ecological aspects of the Wei River have been examined with respect to flow rates in the Wei River.

See also
Guanzhong

References 

Rivers of Gansu
Tributaries of the Yellow River
Rivers of Shaanxi